Mount Thurman is the highest summit in Bravo Hills along the edge of Ross Ice Shelf, located between the mouths of Gough and Le Couteur Glaciers in Antarctica. Named by Advisory Committee on Antarctic Names (US-ACAN) for Commander Robert K. Thurman, U.S. Navy, assistant chief of staff for operations, U.S. Naval Support Force, Antarctica, 1963.
 

Mountains of the Ross Dependency
Dufek Coast